General Gage John Hall  (c.1775 – 18 April 1854) was a British Army officer.

Military career
Hall was commissioned as an ensign on 29 May 1783. Promoted to lieutenant-colonel on 1 January 1801 and to major-general on 4 June 1813, he served as acting Governor of British Mauritius from November 1817 to December 1818. He raised the 99th (Lanarkshire) Regiment of Foot in response to the threat posed by the French intervention in Spain, in March 1824.
 
Hall was promoted to lieutenant-general on 27 March 1825 and to full general on 23 November 1841.

References

 

1854 deaths
British Army generals
1770s births
Governors of British Mauritius